The Sierra Alpujata is a mountain range in southern Spain, part of the coastal mountain range that lies behind the Costa del Sol Occidental, in Andalusia. It is situated between the Sierra Blanca and the Sierra de Mijas.

geography and geology
The highest point is the Cerro Castillejos, at 1,074 metres. Geologically it is located in the Penibaetic System. Due to its mineral constitution, vegetation is  very sparse, despite several attempts at restocking pines and eucalyptus trees. The predominant vegetation consists of juniper and shrubland.

Geologically the range is the relic of an ancient submarine stratovolcano, which formed at the same time than the Sierra Blanca and the Sierra de Mijas. The large crater is recognizable from aerial photos. It is predominantly made of peridotite.

Sources

External links
Sierra Alpujata, (Malaga), Andalucia, Spain

Alpujata
Alpujata